HFG may refer to:

 Hana Financial Group, a South Korean holding company
 Harry Frank Guggenheim Foundation
 Hochschule für Gestaltung, (German: College for design)
Ulm School of Design, defunct
Hochschule für Gestaltung Offenbach
Hochschule für Gestaltung Schwäbisch Gmünd 
Karlsruhe University of Arts and Design